Passiflora × exoniensis, the Exeter passion flower, is a hybrid of garden origin between two species of flowering plants, Passiflora antioquiensis × Passiflora tripartita var. mollissima in the family Passifloraceae. It was hybridised in the Veitch Nurseries in Exeter, Devon, England, in the 1870s. The name Passiflora × exoniensis has yet to be resolved as a correct scientific name; nevertheless it is widely found in the horticultural literature.

It is a robust evergreen climber growing to at least  with three-lobed leaves and pendent deep pink tubular flowers followed by egg-shaped yellow fruits. It is hardy down to about  so may be grown outdoors with shelter in mild temperate areas; alternatively under glass, for instance in an unheated greenhouse.

Passiflora × exoniensis has won the Royal Horticultural Society’s Award of Garden Merit.

References

exoniensis
Hybrid plants